The 1914 New South Wales Rugby Football League premiership was the seventh season of Sydney's top-grade rugby league football club competition, Australia's first. Eight teams from across the city contested during the season. The 1914 season's gate receipts totalled £24,072, which was £7,038 more than the previous season's.

Season summary
Following the retirement of Dally Messenger at the end of the 1913 season, Eastern Suburbs’ stranglehold on the premiership came to an end. In their place, previous premiers South Sydney and Newtown took control of the competition. Newtown were in a good position to take out their second premiership midway through the season but a loss to middle-placed Balmain hurt their cause, although Newtown defeated South Sydney the following week. It turned out that the Balmain loss would make the difference, with South Sydney finishing just one point ahead of Newtown at the end of the season to claim their third premiership. No Finals were contested. Members of the South Sydney premiership winning side included Howard Hallett (Player of the Season), Roy Almond, O. Brown, Arthur Butler, Harry Butler, William Cann, Jim Davis, Wally Dymant, E. Hilliard, Owen McCarthy, Arthur McCabe and Harold Horder.

The season was punctuated by matches against the 1914 Great Britain Lions tour of Australia and New Zealand, and was the last for future Australian Rugby League Hall of Fame inductee Chris McKivat who went on to have a prominent coaching career.

Teams
The teams remained unchanged from the previous season.

 Annandale
 Balmain, formed on 23 January 1908 at Balmain Town Hall
 Eastern Suburbs, formed on 24 January 1908 at Paddington Town Hall
 Glebe, formed on 9 January 1908
 Newtown, formed on 14 January 1908
 North Sydney, formed on February 7, 1908, at the North Sydney School of Arts in Mount Street
 South Sydney, formed on 17 January 1908 at Redfern Town Hall
 Western Suburbs, formed on 4 February 1908

Ladder

References

Sources
 Rugby League Tables - Notes AFL Tables
 Rugby League Tables - Season 1914 AFL Tables
 Premiership History and Statistics RL1908
 1914 - South Sydney Edge Out Newtown RL1908
Results: 1911-20 at rabbitohs.com.au

New South Wales Rugby League premiership
NSWRFL season